Rakymzhan Asembekov (born 6 April 1978) is a Kazakhstani wrestler. He competed in the men's Greco-Roman 54 kg at the 2000 Summer Olympics.

References

1978 births
Living people
Kazakhstani male sport wrestlers
Olympic wrestlers of Kazakhstan
Wrestlers at the 2000 Summer Olympics
People from Shymkent